The Treaty of Saint Petersburg was concluded on January 29, 1834 between the Ottoman Porte and the Russian Empire. This treaty, by promising the evacuation of the Principalities, and reducing the Turkish payments to one-third of the stipulated amount, relieved the Porte from some engagements enforced on it by the Treaty of Adrianople (the treaty which ended the Russo-Turkish War, 1828-1829).

19th century in the Russian Empire
1834 in the Russian Empire
1834 in the Ottoman Empire
1834 treaties
January 1834 events
Ottoman Empire–Russia treaties

References